Marshborough is a small hamlet immediately adjacent to Woodnesborough in East Kent, England.

Listed buildings

Parsonage Farm
The farmhouse was built in the 17th century or earlier, with an 18th-century frontage.

Parsonage Farm Outhouse
An 18th-century stables or outhouse in red brick.

References

External links

Villages in Kent
Dover District